Radenka Maric is an American professor of engineering and academic administrator who became the 17th president of the University of Connecticut on September 28, 2022. She was the first internal candidate to be named president since Harry J. Hartley in 1990 and is the institution’s second female president. She had served as interim president of the University of Connecticut since February 1, 2022 and previously served as UConn's vice president for research and innovation.

Life and career 

Born and raised in Derventa, then part of Yugoslavia, Maric earned her BS from the University of Belgrade in Serbia and her MS and PhD in materials science and energy from Kyoto University in Japan. After spending 12 years in Japan, she moved to the United States in 2001 to work at a clean-energy startup in Atlanta. Three years later, she began leading the Institute for Fuel Cell Innovation at the National Research Council Canada. She joined UConn in 2010 as a professor of chemical and biomolecular engineering. In 2016–2017, she was a visiting Fulbright chair professor at the Polytechnic University of Milan in Italy.

A Board of Trustees Distinguished Professor, Maric holds the faculty appointment of Connecticut Clean Energy Fund Professor of Sustainable Energy in UConn's Department of Chemical and Biomolecular Engineering and Department of Materials Science and Engineering. Over the course of her career, she received more than $40 million in research funding, published more than 300 articles in refereed journals and conference proceedings, and registered six patents.

Maric became vice president for Research, Innovation, and Entrepreneurship in July 2017. In this role, she oversaw the $375 million research enterprise at UConn and UConn Health, including the Technology Incubation Program and the Innovation Partnership Building at UConn Tech Park. She was appointed interim president of UConn on February 1, 2022, succeeding former interim president Andrew Agwunobi, who had resigned to take an executive-level role with Humana.

Maric was named a Fellow of American Association for the Advancement of Science in 2019. She is a member of the Connecticut Academy of Science and Engineering. She is lead author of the book Solid Oxide Fuel Cells: From Fundamental Principles to Complete Systems (Boca Raton: CRC Press, 2020).

References 

Living people
Presidents of the University of Connecticut
University of Belgrade alumni
Kyoto University alumni
21st-century American engineers
American women engineers
American materials scientists
University of Connecticut faculty
Women materials scientists and engineers
Fellows of the American Association for the Advancement of Science
Date of birth missing (living people)
American people of Croatian descent
Year of birth missing (living people)
Women heads of universities and colleges